Goutte d'Or (English: A Drop of Gold) is a 2013 French short film written and directed by Christophe Peladan. It was released onto YouTube on February 6, 2013, and received more than 3,000,000 views. The film tells the story of a dead pirate who falls for a beautiful queen.

Synopsis
As a pirate enters the Kingdom of the Dead he encounters its beautiful Queen. She captures his heart, but hers is not so easily won.

Awards
The film was nominated for Best Short Fiction/Animation at the 2014 Robert Festival.

External links

 

2013 films
2013 animated films
Animated films without speech
French short films
French animated short films
Pirate films
2010s French films